The Champion is a 1915 American silent comedy film released by Essanay Studios, starring Charles Chaplin alongside Edna Purviance and Leo White. Essanay co-owner and star, Broncho Billy Anderson can be seen as an enthusiastic audience member in the boxing match scene.

Plot
In this comedy, Charlie Chaplin has a companion—a pet bulldog.  Walking along a street with his bulldog, Charlie finds a "good luck" horseshoe just as he passes the training camp of an enormous fighter named Spike Dugan.  Outside the camp is a large, painted advertisement which states Dugan is seeking sparring partners "who can take a punch." After watching other better fighters be soundly beaten by Dugan, Charlie decides his best bet is to put the horseshoe inside his boxing glove.  Using the loaded glove, Charlie connects with a solid punch and wins. The trainer prepares Charlie to fight the world champion. A gambler wants Charlie to throw the fight. He and the trainer's daughter fall in love.

Notes
In some versions of the film, an inter-title introducing the heavyweight boxers refers to Spike Dugan as "Spike Hennessey"—although the surname Dugan is clearly painted on the wall surrounding his training camp.

This was the second Chaplin film to focus on boxing.  He had already made a comedy for Keystone Studios, titled The Knockout (1914), in which he was a secondary character—a boxing referee.  In City Lights (1931) he would again play an outsized and outclassed pugilist.

Cast

 Charles Chaplin as Challenger
 Edna Purviance as Trainer's daughter
 Ernest Van Pelt as Spike Dugan
 Lloyd Bacon as Second sparring partner / Referee
 Leo White as Crooked gambler
 Carl Stockdale as Sparring partner
 Billy Armstrong as Sparring partner
 Paddy McGuire as Sparring partner
 Bud Jamison as Bob Uppercut, Champion
 Ben Turpin as Ringside vendor

External links

1915 films
American silent short films
American black-and-white films
Silent American comedy films
Short films directed by Charlie Chaplin
1915 comedy films
Essanay Studios films
1915 short films
Articles containing video clips
American comedy short films
1910s American films